Lal Sinh Vadodia is politician of Bharatiya Janata Party and member of Rajya Sabha from Gujarat state for the term 2014–2020.
He resides at Umreth, Anand district, Gujarat.

References

Bharatiya Janata Party politicians from Gujarat
Living people
Rajya Sabha members from Gujarat
1970 births
People from Anand district